Martina Hingis was the defending champion but did not compete that year.

Lindsay Davenport won in the final 6–4, 5–7, 6–4 against Venus Williams.

Seeds
A champion seed is indicated in bold text while text in italics indicates the round in which that seed was eliminated. The top four seeds received a bye to the second round.

  Lindsay Davenport (champion)
  Monica Seles (semifinals)
  Venus Williams (final)
  Steffi Graf (semifinals)
  Natasha Zvereva (quarterfinals)
  Joannette Kruger (second round)
  Elena Likhovtseva (quarterfinals)
  Rita Grande (first round)

Draw

Final

Section 1

Section 2

External links
 1998 Bank of the West Classic draw

Silicon Valley Classic
1998 WTA Tour